Lwin Ko Latt is a Burmese activist and politician who served as a member of the House of Representatives from Thanlyin Township from 2016 until his removal from office in the 2021 Myanmar coup d'état. He is a member of the Committee Representing Pyidaungsu Hluttaw.

Political career
In the 2015 Myanmar general election, Lwin Ko Latt contested in Thanlyin Township constituency for Pyithu Hluttaw, from National League for Democracy, and won a seat by 70,380 votes.

In the 2020 Myanmar general election, he was re-elected as a MP for Thanlyin Township but was not allowed to assume his seat due to the military coup d'état.

On 5 February 2021, in the aftermath of 2021 Myanmar coup d'état, he became a member of the Committee Representing Pyidaungsu Hluttaw.

On 2 March 2021, CRPH named him Acting Minister of the Office of the President and Acting Minister of the Union Government Office.

References

Living people
Burmese activists
National League for Democracy politicians
1976 births
21st-century Burmese politicians